Glenn Aitken may refer to:

Glenn Aitken (footballer) (born 1952), English former association football player
Glenn Aitken (singer) (born 1970), London-based New Zealand singer-songwriter and musician
Glenn Aitken, former mayor of City of Frankston, Australia
Glenn Aitken, captain of North Sydney Cricket Club